Telford Tigers 2 are an ice hockey team from Telford, England that compete in the NIHL North 2 Division. They are a minor league affiliate of Telford Tigers, who play in the NIHL National Division.

Season-by-season record

Club roster 2020–21

2020/21 Outgoing

References

External links 

 Telford Tigers roster

Telford